Leon Walters (born 9 January 1979 in London) is a British karateka. He is the winner of multiple European Karate Championships and World Karate Championships Karate medals.

Achievements
 1997  World Games  Kumite Gold Medal
 1998  World Karate Championships  Kumite  Bronze Medal
 2001  European Karate Championships Silver Medal
 2002  European Karate Championships Kumite Silver Medal
 2002  World Karate Championships Kumite Gold Medal
 2004  World Karate Championships Silver Medal

References

1979 births
Living people
Sportspeople from London
English male karateka
English male kickboxers
Black British sportspeople
World Games gold medalists
World Games bronze medalists
Competitors at the 1997 World Games
Competitors at the 2001 World Games